Borre Golf Club is a golf club situated by the Oslofjord in Horten, north of Tønsberg in the south east of Norway.

The club was founded in 1990 and the same year established its golf course with nine holes. The following year another nine holes were added and the present 18 hole course were ready.

Borre Golf Club has hosted two Challenge Tour events: the first professional golf tournament on Norwegian soil, the Karsten Ping Norwegian Challenge in 1994, sponsored by Karsten Solheim, and in 1998, the Netcom Norwegian Open.

External links 
 Borre Golfbane (Borre Golf Course)

Golf clubs and courses in Norway
Sports venues in Vestfold og Telemark